Guaitecas is Chilean commune located in Guaitecas Archipelago which are part of Aysén Province and Region. The administrative centre is Melinka, the only port and town in the wider Chonos Archipelago.

Demographics
Of these, 1,411 (91.7%) lived in urban areas and 128 (8.3%) in rural areas. The population grew by 20% (256 persons) between the 1992 and 2002 censuses. Much of the population of Guaitecas is of Chilote-Huilliche background.

Administration
As a commune, Guaitecas is a third-level administrative division of Chile administered by a municipal council, headed by an alcalde (Mayor) who is directly elected every four years. In December 2018 Cristián Alvarado Oyarzo (RN) who was then the mayor was preventively detained as part of an investigation where he was accused of a fraud against the state for at least 340 million pesos. This led to his deposition as mayor and his replacement by municipal councillor Marcos Silva Miranda (PPD), who afterwards won the 2021 municipal elections, being ratified as mayor. In December 2021 Cristián Alvarado was condemned to 10 years of prison and two of his collaborators to seven years of prison each.

Within the electoral divisions of Chile, Guaitecas is represented in the Chamber of Deputies by René Alinco Bustos (Ind-PPD), Miguel Ángel Calisto Águila (PDC) and Aracely Leuquén Uribe (RN), as part of the 27th electoral district, which includes the entire Aysén del General Carlos Ibáñez del Campo Region. The commune is represented in the Senate by Ximena Órdenes (PPD) and David Sandoval (UDI),  as part of the 14th senatorial constituency, identical to the 27th district.

References

External links
  Municipality of Guaitecas

Communes of Chile
Aysén Region